Ballindalloch is a small village on the River Spey in Scotland.

It is known for its whisky distilleries and for Ballindalloch Castle.
 In Ballindalloch itself, there are two distilleries, Cragganmore distillery and Ballindalloch distillery. On the western edge of Ballindalloch is the Tormore distillery.

Ballindalloch previously had a railway station, Ballindalloch railway station that opened on 1 July 1863 and was part of the Strathspey Railway (GNoSR) but it closed on 18 October 1965.

References

See also
Glenfarclas Single Malt
Tomintoul

Villages in Moray